The Tennessee Tornado is a roller coaster at Dollywood amusement park in Pigeon Forge, Tennessee, United States. It debuted April 17, 1999, and was Dollywood's first major coaster expansion as well as one of Arrow Dynamics' last major coasters.  The ride opened in a valley location previously occupied by Thunder Express, an Arrow Dynamics Mine Train roller coaster relocated from Six Flags St. Louis in 1989 and opened in 2002 at Magic Springs and Crystal Falls.

History
On June 30, 1998, Dollywood announced that Tennessee Tornado would be coming to the park. Arrow Dynamics was hired to build a newer Custom Looping Coaster. Vertical construction of the ride started in the fall of 1998 and was completed in early 1999. The Thunder Express station was also reused for the new ride. Tennessee Tornado would open to the public on April 17, 1999.

Ride elements
110' tall loop
Loop
Sidewinder

Tennessee Tornado has several unique features not found on other Arrow Dynamics looping coasters.  At the time of the coaster's construction it had been several years since the company had last built a sit-down looping coaster, so the designers created new elements and track designs for the ride, including two overbanked curves and a  "Spiro loop", the largest inversion on any Arrow Dynamics coaster.

Tennessee Tornado is also unique in that it uses a tubular steel beam support structure similar to that of Bolliger & Mabillard roller coasters, rather than the more typical Arrow Dynamics scaffolding-style supports found on rides such as Carolina Cyclone at Carowinds and Vortex at Kings Island. This kind of support structure was first used on the defunct Drachen Fire at Busch Gardens Williamsburg, which opened in 1992 and closed in 1998.

The "story" behind the coaster is set In the late 1800's when a strong tornado sweeps through Tennessee, pulling all of the minecarts out of a local mineshaft and throwing them about.

Gallery

References

External links
Dollywood-Tennessee Tornado (Official Website)
a souverier video sold by Dollywood

Roller coasters in Tennessee
Buildings and structures in Sevier County, Tennessee
Dollywood
Roller coasters introduced in 1999
Roller coasters operated by Herschend Family Entertainment
Western (genre) amusement rides
1999 establishments in Tennessee